USNS Pecos (T-AO-197) is a Henry J. Kaiser-class underway replenishment oiler operated by the Military Sealift Command to support ships of the United States Navy, and the third such ship to be named after the Pecos River.

Pecos, the eleventh Henry J. Kaiser-class ship, was laid down on 17 February 1988 at Avondale Shipyards in New Orleans, Louisiana, and launched on 23 September 1989. She was delivered to the Navy and placed in non-commissioned service with a primarily civilian crew under the control of the Military Sealift Command on 6 July 1990. The ship is equipped with a helicopter platform to allow for at-sea transfer of personnel and supplies.

Pecos is part of the MSC Naval Auxiliary Force, MSC Pacific, in the United States Pacific Fleet, and has received the National Defense Service Medal, the Armed Forces Expeditionary Medal twice, and the Southwest Asia Service Medal.

On 9 December 1999 a United States Marine Corps CH-46 Sea Knight helicopter crashed into Pecos and sank while participating in a training mission. Seven of the 18 personnel on board the helicopter were killed in the accident. As routine procedure following an accident, members of the crew were subjected to drug testing. Captain Mark LaRochelle, the ship's Master, failed the initial and secondary drug tests and was subsequently relieved of command and fired from the Military Sealift Command. Following his dismissal from MSC, his US Coast Guard license was revoked.

During Operation Tomodachi, Pecos rendezvoused with United States Seventh Fleet flagship  near Kyushu, Japan. Blue Ridge transferred 96 pallets of humanitarian assistance and disaster relief material to Pecos for delivery to the Essex Amphibious Group and Carrier Strike Group 5. Weighing as much as  each, the pallets contained water containers and water purification tablets, first-aid products, tarpaulins, blankets, and other supplies. The ship arrived off Sendai on 25 March for more underway replenishment operations.

On 28 November 2018, the United States Navy sent Pecos and  through the Taiwan Strait as a demonstration of the "U.S. commitment to a free and open Indo-Pacific," according to a U.S. Pacific Fleet spokesman. The transit took place only a few days before a planned meeting between U.S. President Donald Trump and Chinese President Xi Jinping at the G20 summit in Buenos Aires, Argentina.

References

External links

Footage from YouTube of the CH-46 accident on 9 DEC 1999.
CNN.com article  regarding the CH-46 accident on 9 DEC 1999.

 

Henry J. Kaiser-class oilers
Cold War auxiliary ships of the United States
Ships built in Bridge City, Louisiana
Maritime incidents in 1999
1989 ships